Punjab State Highway 24, commonly referred to as SH 24, is a state highway in the state of Punjab in India. This state highway runs through Hoshiarpur District and Shaheed Bhagat Singh Nagar district from Dasuya to Balachaur in the state of Punjab. The total length of the highway is 101 kilometres.

Route description
The route of the highway is Dasuya-Gardhiwala-Hoshiarpur-Chabbewal-Mahilpur-Garhshankar.

Major junctions

  National Highway 44 in Dasuya
  National Highway 3 
  NH 503 in Hoshiarpur
 Major District Road 53 (MDR 53) in Garhshankar
  NH 344A in Balachaur

See also
 List of state highways in Punjab, India

References 

State Highways in Punjab, India